2985 Shakespeare is a stony Koronian asteroid from the outer region of the asteroid belt. It was discovered on 12 October 1983, by American astronomer Edward Bowell at Lowell's Anderson Mesa Station near Flagstaff, Arizona, and later named after William Shakespeare.

Classification and orbit 

The S-type asteroid is a member of the Koronis family, a group consisting of about 200 known bodies. It orbits the Sun in the outer main-belt at a distance of 2.7–3.0 AU once every 4 years and 10 months (1,756 days). Its orbit has an eccentricity of 0.05 and an inclination of 3° with respect to the ecliptic. The body's observation arc begins with its identification  at Crimea–Nauchnij, 7 years prior to its official discovery observation at Anderson Mesa.

Naming 

This minor planet was named after William Shakespeare (1564–1616), the English renaissance dramatist and poet. The approved naming citation was published by the Minor Planet Center on 29 September 1985.

Physical characteristics

Rotation period and poles 

Three different rotational lightcurves, obtained from photometric observations taken at the Palomar Transient Factory and a group of seven observatories, respectively, found a concurring rotation period of 6.06–6.08 hours with a brightness variation between 0.37 and 0.53 magnitude.

Diameter and albedo 

According to the space-based NEOWISE mission of NASA's Wide-field Infrared Survey Explorer, the body has an albedo of 0.26 and measures 10.5 kilometers in diameter, while the Collaborative Asteroid Lightcurve Link assumes a standard albedo for members of the Koronis family of 0.24 and calculates a diameter of 10.3 kilometers with an absolute magnitude of 12.1.

References

External links 
 Lightcurve Database Query (LCDB), at www.minorplanet.info
 Dictionary of Minor Planet Names, Google books
 Asteroids and comets rotation curves, CdR – Geneva Observatory, Raoul Behrend
 Discovery Circumstances: Numbered Minor Planets (1)-(5000) – Minor Planet Center
 
 

002985
Discoveries by Edward L. G. Bowell
Named minor planets
19831012